Les McCann Ltd. in New York is a live album by pianist Les McCann recorded in 1961 and released on the Pacific Jazz label.

Reception

The Allmusic review by Mark Allan called the album: "A thoroughly satisfying live date".

Track listing 
All compositions by Les McCann except as indicated
 "Chip Monck" - 7:45
 "Fayth, You're..." - 6:10
 "Cha Cha Twist" - 7:38
 "A Little ¾ for God & Co." - 9:24
 "Maxie's Changes" - 8:51
 "Someone Stole My Chitlins" - 5:10 :Bonus track on CD reissue
 "One More Hamhock Please" (Curtis Amy) - 8:56 :Bonus track on CD reissue
 "Oat Meal" (McCann, Hutcherson) - 4:57 :Bonus track on CD reissue
 Recorded at the Village Gate in NYC on December 28, 1961 (tracks 1–6) and at Pacific Jazz Studios in Hollywood, CA in late 1960 (tracks 7 & 8). Tracks 7 and 8 originally issued in edited form as Pacific Jazz X-316 (45rpm single).

Personnel 
Les McCann - piano
Stanley Turrentine - tenor saxophone (tracks 1–6)
Blue Mitchell - trumpet (tracks 1–6; solo: tracks 3–6)
Frank Haynes - tenor saxophone (tracks 1–6; solo: tracks 5–6) note: Haynes' name is misspelled on the album cover
Herbie Lewis - bass
Ron Jefferson - drums
Curtis Amy - tenor saxophone (track 7) 
Bobby Hutcherson - vibraphone (tracks 7–8)

References 

Les McCann live albums
1962 live albums
Pacific Jazz Records live albums
Albums recorded at the Village Gate